This is the list of Masterpiece Classic episodes in order by season.

Episodes 

In early 2008, Masterpiece Theatre and its affiliated program Mystery! were reformatted as Masterpiece.  Masterpiece is aired as three different series.  Initially, Masterpiece Classic aired in the winter and early spring, Masterpiece Mystery! in the late spring and summer, and Masterpiece Contemporary in the fall.  In later seasons, particularly after an increase in funding for WGBH and Masterpiece, the scheduling became more random.  Currently, all three programs air at any time throughout the year, and on nearly half the Sundays, two episodes from two different miniseries will air on the same night.

This lists the titles of the individual miniseries.  Some ran for only one episode, many ran for two or more installments.  The following lists them according to original season, and then in alphabetical order.  The number of the season continues in the sequence set by the predecessor series, Masterpiece Theatre, which ended with Season 37.  This is in spite of the fact that the other predecessor series, Mystery!, ended with Season 27.  All episodes that air in one calendar year are considered to be in the same season.

For lists of episodes of the other two series, see List of Masterpiece Mystery! episodes, and List of Masterpiece Contemporary episodes.  For older episodes of Masterpiece Theatre, see List of Masterpiece Theatre episodes.

This list does not include any rebroadcasts of series, including those previously shown on Masterpiece Theatre or Mystery!

As of the start of broadcasting Victoria Series One in January 2017, Masterpiece Classic was no longer branded as such, but simply Masterpiece (on screen, PBS Masterpiece online and social media), and it no longer had an on-screen host.

Season 38 (2008) 
 The Complete Jane Austen
 Persuasion (Jan 13)
 Northanger Abbey (Jan 20)
 Mansfield Park (Jan 27)
 Miss Austen Regrets (Feb 3)
 Pride and Prejudice (Feb 10, 17 and 24)
 Emma (Mar 23)
 Sense and Sensibility (Mar 30 and Apr 6)
 A Room With a View (Apr 13)
 My Boy Jack (Apr 20)
 Cranford (May 4, 11 and 18)

Season 39 (2009) 
 The Tales of Charles Dickens
 Little Dorrit (Mar 29, Apr 5, 12, 19, and 26)
 The Old Curiosity Shop (May 3)
 Oliver Twist (Feb 15 and 22)
 Tess of the D'Urbervilles (Jan 4 and 11)
 Wuthering Heights (Jan 18 and 25)

Season 40 (2010) 
 The Diary of Anne Frank (Apr 11)
 Emma (Jan 24, 31, and Feb 7)
 Return to Cranford (Jan 10 and 17)
 Sharpe
 Sharpe's Challenge (Mar 28)
 Sharpe's Peril (Apr 4)
 Small Island (Apr 18 and 25)
 The 39 Steps (Feb 28)

Season 41 (2011) 
 Any Human Heart (Feb 13, 20, and 27)
 Downton Abbey, series I (Jan 9, 16, 23, and 30)
 South Riding (May 1, 8, and 15)
 Upstairs, Downstairs, series I (Apr 10, 17, and 24)

Season 42 (2012) 
 Birdsong (Apr 22 and 29)
 Downton Abbey, series II (Jan 8, 15, 22, 29, Feb 5, 12, and 19)
 Great Expectations (Apr 1 and 8)
 The Mystery of Edwin Drood (Apr 15)
 Upstairs, Downstairs, series II (Oct 7, 14, 21, 28, Nov 4, and 11)

Season 43 (2013) 
 Downton Abbey, series III (Jan 6, 13, 20, 27, Feb 3, 10, and 17)
 Mr Selfridge, series I (Mar 31, Apr 7, 14, 21, 28, May 5, 12, and 19)
 The Paradise, series I (Oct 6, 13, 20, 27, Nov 3, 10, and 17)

Season 44 (2014) 
 Downton Abbey, series IV (Jan 5, 12, 19, 26, Feb 2, 9, 16, and 23)
 Mr Selfridge, series II (Mar 30, Apr 6, 13, 20, 27, May 4, 11, and 18)
 The Paradise, series II (Sept 28, Oct 5, 12, 19, 26, Nov 2, 9, and 16)

Season 45 (2015) 
 Downton Abbey, series V (Jan 4, 11, 18, and 25, Feb 1, 8, 15, and 22, and Mar 1)
 Home Fires, series I (Oct 4, 11, 18, and 25, Nov 1 and 8)
 Indian Summers, series I (Sept 27, Oct 4, 11, 18, and 25, Nov 1, 8, 15, and 22)
 The Manners of Downton Abbey – A Masterpiece Special (Jan 4)
 Mr Selfridge, series III (Mar 29, Apr 5, 12, 19, and 26, May 3, 10, and 17)
 Poldark, series I (June 21 and 28, July 5, 12, 19, and 26, and Aug 2)
 Wolf Hall (Apr 5, 12, 19, and 26, May 3 and 10)

Season 46 (2016) 
 Churchill's Secret (Sept 11)
 Downton Abbey, series VI (Jan 3, 10, 17, 24, and 31, Feb 7, 14, and 21, and Mar 6)
 The Durrells in Corfu, series I (Oct 16, 23, and 30, Nov 6, 13, and 20)
 Indian Summers, series II (Sept 11, 18, and 25, Oct 2, 9, 16, and 30, Nov 6, 13, and 20)
 Mr Selfridge, series IV (Mar 27, Apr 3, 10, 17, and 24, May 1, 8, 15, and 22)
 Poldark, series II (Sept 25, Oct 2, 16, 23, and 30, Nov 6, 13, 20, and 27)

Season 47 (2017) 
 The Collection (Oct 8, 15, 22, and 29, Nov 5, 12, and 19)
 The Durrells in Corfu, series II (Oct 15, 22, and 29, Nov 5, 12, and 19)
 Home Fires, series II (Apr 2, 9, 16, 23, and 30 and May 7)
 King Charles III (May 14)
 Poldark, series III (Oct 1, 8, 15, 22, and 29, Nov 5, 12, and 19)
 To Walk Invisible: The Brontë Sisters (Mar 26)
 Victoria, series I (Jan 15, 22, and 29, Feb 5, 12, and 19, and Mar 5)

Season 48 (2018) 
 The Durrells in Corfu, series III (Sep 30, Oct 7, 14, 21, and 28, Nov 4, 11, and 18)
 Little Women (May 13 and 20)
 The Miniaturist (Sep 9, 16, and 23)
 Poldark, series IV (Sep 30, Oct 7, 14, 21, and 28, Nov 4, 11, and 18)
 Victoria, series II (Jan 14, 21, and 28, Feb 4, 11, 18, and 25)

Season 49 (2019) 
 The Durrells in Corfu, series IV (Sep 29, Oct 6, 13, 20, and 27, Nov 3)
 Les Misérables (Apr 14, 21, and 28, May 5, 12, and 19)
 Mrs. Wilson (Mar 31 and Apr 7)
 Poldark, series V (Sep 29, Oct 6, 13, 20, and 27, Nov 3, 10, and 17)
 Press (Oct 6, 13, 20, and 27, Nov 3 and 10)
 Victoria, series III (Jan 13, 20, and 27, Feb 3, 10, 17, and 24, and Mar 3)

Season 50 (2020) 
 Howards End (Jan 12, 19, and 26, Feb 2)
 Beecham House (June 14, 21, and 28, July 5, 12, and 19)
 Sanditon, series I (Jan 12, 19, and 26, Feb 2, 16, and 23)
 World on Fire (Apr 5, 12, 19, and 26, May 3, 10, and 17)

Season 51 (2021) 
 All Creatures Great and Small, series I (Jan 10, 17, 24, and 31, Feb 7, 14, and 21)
 Atlantic Crossing (Apr 4, 11, 18, and 25, May 2, 9, 16, and 23)
 The Long Song (Jan 31, Feb 7 and 14)
 Us (June 20 and 27)

Season 52 (2022) 
 All Creatures Great and Small, series II (Jan 9, 16, 23, and 30, Feb 6, 13, and 20)
 Around the World in 80 Days (Jan 2, 9, 16, 23, and 30, Feb 6, 13, and 20)
 Ridley Road (May 1, 8, 15, and 22)
 Sanditon, series II (Mar 20 and 27, Apr 3, 10, 17, and 24)

Season 53 (2023) 
 All Creatures Great and Small, series III (Jan 8, 15, 22, and 29, Feb 5, 12, and 19)
 Sanditon, series III (Mar 19 and 26, Apr 2, 9, 16, and 23)
 Tom Jones (Apr 30, May 7, 14, and 21)

References

External links 
 

Masterpiece Classic episodes